Wraysbury railway station serves the village of Wraysbury in Berkshire, England, as well as the larger villages of Stanwell Moor and Poyle.

The station is on the line between Windsor and Eton Riverside and Waterloo. Services are operated by South Western Railway.

As part of the proposed AirTrack rail link, a new station, to be called Staines High Street railway station would be built between Wraysbury and Staines railway station. This proposal (involving rebuilding a former station) has been in doubt for some years.

Services
There is one train per hour in each direction on Sundays.

References

External links

Buildings and structures in the Royal Borough of Windsor and Maidenhead
Railway stations in Berkshire
Former London and South Western Railway stations
Railway stations in Great Britain opened in 1861
Railway stations served by South Western Railway
1861 establishments in England